The Pool of the Black One is a  collection of two fantasy short stories written by Robert E. Howard featuring his sword and sorcery hero Conan the Barbarian.  The book was published in 1986 by Donald M. Grant, Publisher, Inc. as volume X of their deluxe Conan set.  The title story originally appeared in the magazine Weird Tales.  "Drums of Tombalku"  is the original fragment of a story that Howard never completed.  It first appeared, completed by L. Sprague de Camp, in the collection Conan the Adventurer.

Contents
 "The Pool of the Black One"
 "Drums of Tombalku"

References

1986 short story collections
Fantasy short story collections
Conan the Barbarian books
Donald M. Grant, Publisher books